Lake Beshear is a  reservoir located in Caldwell and Christian counties in Kentucky. Impounded in 1962, the lake lies within the Pennyrile Forest State Resort Park.

See also
Pennyrile Forest State Resort Park

References

External links
Ky Dept of Fish and Wildlife - Access Site Info

Infrastructure completed in 1962
Buildings and structures in Caldwell County, Kentucky
Buildings and structures in Christian County, Kentucky
Reservoirs in Kentucky
Protected areas of Christian County, Kentucky
Protected areas of Caldwell County, Kentucky
Bodies of water of Christian County, Kentucky
Bodies of water of Caldwell County, Kentucky